The Central District of Khamir County is a district (bakhsh) in Khamir County, Hormozgan Province, Iran. At the 2006 census, its population was 35,917, in 7,645 families.  The District has one city: Bandar Khamir.  The District has two rural districts (dehestan): Khamir Rural District and Kohurestan Rural District.

References 

Districts of Hormozgan Province
Khamir County